American country music singer and songwriter Billy Currington has released seven studio albums and one compilation album, all via Mercury Nashville. He has also released twenty singles to country radio, eleven of which reached number one on the U.S. Billboard Hot Country Songs or Country Airplay charts: "Must Be Doin' Somethin' Right", "Good Directions", "People Are Crazy", "That's How Country Boys Roll", "Pretty Good at Drinkin' Beer", "Let Me Down Easy", "Hey Girl", "We Are Tonight", "Don't It", "It Don't Hurt Like It Used To", and "Do I Make You Wanna". Three other singles have made the Top 10 on the charts as well. Mr. Currington has sold over 3 million albums and 19 million singles in the United States.

Studio albums

Compilation albums

Singles

2000s

2010s

A "Like My Dog" did not enter the Hot 100, but charted at number 2 on the Bubbling Under Hot 100 Singles.

As a featured artist

Promotional singles

Videography

Music videos

Guest appearances

References

Country music discographies
Discographies of American artists